The Colaiste Ide College of Further Education is a coeducational, nondenominational centre of education funded and managed by the City of Dublin Education and Training Board to provide a Further Education service to the community of Finglas in Dublin North-West. It seeks to provide a school of excellence in which each individual student and staff member may reach his or her potential in a welcoming, supportive and safe environment.

College Facilities
 Open Learning Centre
 Lecture Rooms
 State-of-the-Art Language Laboratory
 Learning Resource Centre
 Science Laboratory
 Technology Room
 CAD Laboratory
 Architectural Drawing Room
 Electronic Technology Laboratory
 Industrial Kitchens
 Fashion / Textiles Studio
 Sculpture Studio
 Printmaking Studio
 Design/Computer Studio
 Photography Studio/Dark Room
 Sports Complex
 Computer Rooms
 All-weather Football Pitches
 Circuit Training Studio
 Aerobic studio

Certification
All courses are certified by the FETAC and/or by the relevant Professional and Examining Bodies. Upon successful completion of a course each student will receive a folder containing:

 FETAC and/or Professional Body Certificate
 College Reference
 Summary of Course Content

External examining bodies
 Further Education and Training Awards Council (FETAC) - QQI from 2012.
 National Certificate in Exercise and Fitness (NCEF)
 Institute of Accounting Technicians in Ireland (IATI)
 City & Guilds of London
 International Therapy Examination Council (ITEC)
 International Air Transport Association (IATA)
 The National Training Provider
 Coaching Certification
 Football Association of Ireland (FAI)
 Royal Life Saving Society (RLSS)
 City of Dublin Vocational  Education Committee (CDVEC)
 Irish Water Safety (IWS)
 GAA
 Swim Ireland
 HSA
 Airport Training Recruitment Services
 Viasinc

References

Universities and colleges in the Republic of Ireland
Further education colleges in Dublin (city)